Paul Christopher Nobes (born 20 April 1964) is a former Australian first class cricketer. He was a right-handed top order batsman, usually playing at 3 or as an opener.

He started his career with South Australia in the 1988/89 season. After just one game he found himself facing the touring West Indian side and performed with distinction, making 95 in his second innings. He spent 1991/92 and 1992/93 with Victoria before he returned to South Australia and continued to perform consistently, scoring over 700 runs in each of the next three seasons.

Nobes performed well in Sheffield Shield finals, he made a century against Queensland when they lost the 1994/95 final and another when drew the final against Western Australia the following season. Since South Australia topped the rankings in the regular season, they won the Shield.

He later served as South Australia's chairman of selectors.

References

External links

1964 births
Living people
Australian cricketers
Victoria cricketers
South Australia cricketers
Cricketers from Melbourne
People from Heidelberg, Victoria